Selvasaura brava, the brave forest microtegu, occurs in Peru.

References
  

Selvasaura
Reptiles described in 2018
Taxa named by Jiří Moravec (herpetologist)
Taxa named by Jiří Šmíd
Taxa named by Jan Štundl
Taxa named by Edgar Lehr